Trend Radio is a Bosnian local commercial radio station, broadcasting from Velika Kladuša, Bosnia and Herzegovina.

This radio station broadcasts a variety of programs such as music, talk show and local news. The owner of the radio station is the company NURRAH D.O.O. Velika Kladuša - PJ TREND RADIO Velika Kladuša.

Program is mainly produced in Bosnian language at one FM frequency (Velika Kladuša  ) and it is available in the Velika Kladuša area and in neighboring Croatia.

Estimated number of listeners of Trend Radio is around 22.389.

Frequencies
 Velika Kladuša

See also 
 List of radio stations in Bosnia and Herzegovina
 Radio Bihać
 Novi Radio Bihać
 Radio Cazin
 Radio Bosanska Krupa
 Radio USK
 Radio Velkaton

References

External links 
 www.trendradio.ba
  www.radiostanica.ba
 Communications Regulatory Agency of Bosnia and Herzegovina
Mass media in Velika Kladuša
Velika Kladuša
Radio stations established in 2018